Alexander Garden of Troup (1714 – 21 December 1785) was a Scottish politician.

He was the eldest son of Alexander Garden of Troup, Banffshire, advocate, by Jean, the daughter of Sir Francis Grant, 1st Baronet of Cullen, Banff and educated in Edinburgh and at King's College, Aberdeen. His younger brother was Francis Garden, Lord Gardenstone.

He was the Member of Parliament (MP) for Aberdeenshire from 1768 to 1785. He was a noted Scottish independent.

He died unmarried at his home, Troup House, in 1785.

References

1714 births
1785 deaths
Members of the Parliament of Great Britain for Scottish constituencies
British MPs 1768–1774
British MPs 1774–1780
British MPs 1780–1784
British MPs 1784–1790